Angelo Miguel Leo (born May 15, 1994) is an American professional boxer who held the WBO junior featherweight title from 2020 to January 2021. As of June 2021, he is ranked as the world's fifth best active junior featherweight by The Ring.

Professional career

Early career
Leo made his professional debut on November 17, 2012, scoring a four-round majority decision (MD) victory over Jesus Xavier Pacheco (Per Ardua) at the Crowne Plaza Hotel in Albuquerque, New Mexico, with the two judges scoring the bout 40–36 and 39–37 in favour of Leo while the third scored it even at 38–38.

After compiling a record of 18–0 (8 KOs) he faced Cesar Juarez for the vacant WBO-NABO junior featherweight title on December 28, 2019, at the State Farm Arena in Atlanta, Georgia. Leo dropped his opponent to the canvas twice in round six before scoring a third knockdown in the eleventh. Juarez beat referee Jim Korb's count only for Korb to call off the contest in order to save Juarez from further punishment, awarding Leo the WBO regional title via eleventh-round technical knockout (TKO).

WBO junior featherweight champion

Leo vs. Williams
On July 9, 2020, it was revealed that the reigning WBO junior featherweight champion Emanuel Navarrete would vacate the title and move up to featherweight. The WBO accordingly ordered their #1 ranked junior featherweight contender Stephan Fulton to face the #2 ranked Leo for the vacant belt. The title bout was scheduled as the main event of an August 1 Showtime broadcast card, which took place at the Mohegan Sun Arena in Montville, Connecticut. Fulton withdrew from the bout on July 29, due to a positive COVID-19 test, and was replaced by Tramaine Williams. Neither fighter was seen as the favorite to win, as most odds-makers either had both boxers at -120 pick'em odds, or had Williams as a slight -125 favorite. Leo won the fight by unanimous decision, with scores of 117-111, 118-110 and 118-110. Fulton stated his desire to make his first title defense against Fulton, saying in his post-fight interview: "The fans want it, so why not bring it on?".

Leo vs. Fulton
Leo was booked to make his first WBO junior featherweight title defense against Stephan Fulton. The fight was scheduled as the main event of a January 23, 2021, card that took place at the Mohegan Sun Arena in Montville, Connecticut, and was broadcast by Showtime. The pair was originally scheduled to face each other for the vacant title on August 1, 2020, before Fulton withdrew due to COVID-19. Leo entered his first title defense as a +135 underdog, while Fulton was seen as a -160 favorite. Fulton won the fight by unanimous decision, with scores of 118-110, 119-111 and 119-111. Fulton landed 364 to Leo's 262 total punches, and outlanded Leo 320 to 238 in power punches.

Continued super bantamweight career
Leo faced the one-time WBC super bantamweight title challenger Aarón Alameda on June 19, 2021, on the undercard of the WBC middleweight title bout between reigning champion Jermall Charlo and title challenger Juan Macias Montiel. He won the fight by majority decision. Two of the judges scored the fight 96-94 and 98-92 for Leo, while the third judge scored it as an even 95-95 draw.

Professional boxing record

See also
List of world super-bantamweight boxing champions
List of Mexican boxing world champions

References

External links

Living people
1994 births
Boxers from Albuquerque, New Mexico
American male boxers
Super-bantamweight boxers
World Boxing Organization champions
World super-bantamweight boxing champions